Saint Joseph Township is one of twenty townships in Allen County, Indiana, United States. As of the 2010 census, its population was 72,245.

History
The Martin Blume Jr. Farm was listed on the National Register of Historic Places in 2006.

Geography
The mostly suburban township includes portions of the cities of Fort Wayne (Indiana's second largest city) and New Haven. The St. Joseph River flows through the western part of the township.

Cities and towns
 Fort Wayne (northeast portion)
 New Haven (north edge)

Adjacent townships
The township is adjacent to these Indiana townships:
 Adams (south)
 Cedar Creek (northeast)
 Milan (east)
 Perry (northwest)
 Washington (west)
 Wayne (southwest)

Education
St. Joseph Township is the home of Indiana University – Purdue University Fort Wayne (IPFW). With an enrollment of 14,192, it is the fifth-largest public university campus in Indiana. The township is also home to the Northeast Indiana regional campus of Ivy Tech Community College, the second-largest public community college campus in the state.

St. Joseph Township's private colleges and universities includes Concordia Theological Seminary (Lutheran).

The township is also home to two high schools: R. Nelson Snider High School, a large public school operated by Fort Wayne Community Schools, and Blackhawk Christian School, a private K–12 school operated by Blackhawk Ministries.

Libraries
St. Joseph Township residents are served by the Allen County Public Library's Georgetown Branch.

Transportation
Public transportation in St. Joseph Township is provided by the Fort Wayne Public Transportation Corporation's Citilink and Campuslink bus systems.

Major highways

Recreation
The City of Fort Wayne operates Shoaff Park in the township, a  park located on the banks of the St. Joseph River. The park offers hiking, boating, public golf course, a disk golf course, tennis courts, basketball courts, soccer fields, and a playground with splashpad.

Climate

References
 
 United States Census Bureau cartographic boundary files
 U.S. Board on Geographic Names

External links

 

Townships in Allen County, Indiana
Fort Wayne, IN Metropolitan Statistical Area
Townships in Indiana